Circoli was an Italian language bimonthly literary magazine published in Genoa, Italy, between 1931 and 1936. It was described as one of the most distinguished European magazines in 1934.

History and profile
Circoli was started in Genoa in 1931. Adriano Grande, an Italian poet, was the founder of the magazine, which intended to be the successor of Solaria, a literary magazine published in Turin and Florentine. Circoli was subtitled Rivista di Poesi (Italian: Poetry Magazine) and was published on a bimonthly basis. The publisher was Grafico editoriale. From 1935 the frequency of the magazine became monthly.

Grande was also the director of the magazine, which published translations of the work by international authors, among others. Attilio Bertolucci and Salvatore Quasimodo were among the contributors to the magazine. During its existence the magazine was supported by the press office. In December 1939 the magazine was closed down with the publication of the twelfth issue.

See also
 List of magazines in Italy

References

1931 establishments in Italy
1939 disestablishments in Italy
Bi-monthly magazines published in Italy
Defunct literary magazines published in Italy
Italian-language magazines
Literary translation magazines
Magazines established in 1931
Magazines disestablished in 1939
Mass media in Genoa
Monthly magazines published in Italy
Poetry literary magazines